Samuel Washington Weis (1870–1956) was an American cotton broker, painter and sketch artist.

Early life and education
Samuel Weis was born in Natchez, Mississippi to Caroline (née Mayer) (1841–1885) and Julius Weis (1826–1909).  His father was a German Jewish immigrant who came to the United States in 1845.  His parents married in 1864 and moved from Natchez, where his mother was raised, to New Orleans.  There Julius Weis became a successful broker buying and selling cotton.  Caroline Weis returned to her mother in Natchez for the births of four of her seven children, including Samuel, born August 8, 1870.

After schooling in New Orleans, his parents sent Samuel to Phillips Exeter Academy for preparatory school, graduating in 1888.  He attended college at the Massachusetts Institute of Technology, where he was a member of the Alpha Theta Chapter of the Sigma Chi fraternity.

Career
Samuel Weis joined his father in the cotton business and painted as a hobby, achieving something of a reputation in New Orleans as an artist. He moved to Chicago and became president of Ilg Electric Ventilating Company, founded in 1906. The company supplied fans for Navy ships in World War I and produced industrial fans, out of a series of large factories in Chicago.

Marriage and family
Samuel Weis married Edith Frank (1882–1971), and the couple had one child, Frances Weis Pick (1905–1988), a painter of watercolors.

Samuel Washington Weis died April 6, 1956.

References
 Falk, Peter Hastings, Who Was Who in American Art, 1564-1975, Madison, CT, Sound View Press, 1999, Vol. III, p. 3505.
 Jacobsen, Anita, Jacobsen's Biographical Index of American Artists, Dallas, Texas, A.J. Publications, 2002, Vol. I, Book IV, p. 3429.
 Mahe, John, Encyclopedia of New Orleans Artists 1718-1918, Historic New Orleans, New Orleans, 1987, p. 408.

External links
 Samuel Washington Weis, AskART

Footnotes

1870 births
1956 deaths
People from Natchez, Mississippi
Artists from Louisiana
Artists from Mississippi
19th-century American painters
19th-century American male artists
20th-century American painters
American male painters
American people of German-Jewish descent
Jewish American artists
Jewish painters
Phillips Exeter Academy alumni
Massachusetts Institute of Technology alumni
20th-century American male artists